Harvest was an American Neopagan magazine, published eight times a year between 1980 and 1992.

History and profile
Harvest began in 1980 as grassroots, homemade zine. Over its twelve-year publication run it grew to be a 42-page, professionally printed magazine with international distribution and news-stand sales. Published out of Southboro, Massachusetts, Harvest served both the New England and international Neopagan communities. In an era before mainstream access to the Internet, and before the creation of the World Wide Web, Pagan magazines such as Harvest provided crucial opportunities for networking, sharing of information, and the development of the international Neopagan community.

In an Utne Reader feature on Pagan publications, James Tedford wrote,

In comparison to other Pagan publications of the time, Tedford continued,

In addition to covering the more common traditions of Neopaganism, such as Wicca, Harvest also gave a forum to some of the emerging Polytheistic Reconstructionist movements. A number of Neopagan writers had their first publication in Harvest, and the letters column provided an active forum for the development of community consensus on terminology and other issues of importance to Neopagans in the 1980s and 1990s.

In Drawing Down the Moon: Witches, Druids, Goddess-Worshippers, and Other Pagans in America Today, Margot Adler described Harvest as:

Harvest was founded by publishers, writers and editors Morven and Brenwyn. After Brenwyn left, Morven became the editor in chief. At the end of 1992, Morven retired from the staff to pursue her own writing. Respecting Morven's ownership of the name, the staff continued publishing quarterly for the next six issues, renaming the magazine Tides. Morven continued to serve in an informal capacity as an advisor to the new incarnation of the magazine.

See also
 Green Egg

References

1980s in modern paganism
Magazines established in 1980
Defunct magazines published in the United States
Eight times annually magazines published in the United States
Magazines published in Massachusetts
Modern pagan magazines
Religion in Massachusetts
Religious magazines published in the United States
Zines
Magazines disestablished in 1992